Albany Junior/Senior High School is a public high school located in the city of Albany, Texas, USA and classified as a 2A school by the UIL.  It is a part of the Albany Independent School District located in central Shackelford County.   In 2015, the school was rated "Met Standard" by the Texas Education Agency.

Athletics
The Albany Lions compete in these sports - 

Volleyball, Cross Country, Football, Basketball, Golf, Tennis, Track, Baseball & Softball

State titles
Football - 
1961(1A), 1962(1A), 2022 (2A/D2)
Boys Golf - 
1966(1A)
Girls Track - 
1991(2A)

Alumni
William E. Dyess (1916–1943) – fighter pilot, namesake of Dyess Air Force Base near Abilene

References

External links
Albany ISD website

Public high schools in Texas
Schools in Shackelford County, Texas